New Mexico State University (NMSU or NM State) is a public land-grant research university in Las Cruces, New Mexico. Founded in 1888, it is the state's oldest public institution of higher education and one of two flagship universities, along with the University of New Mexico. NMSU has campuses in Alamogordo, Doña Ana County, and Grants, as well as research centers and programs in all 33 counties in the state.

Initially established as Las Cruces College, NMSU was designated a land-grant college in 1898 and renamed New Mexico College of Agriculture and Mechanic Arts; it received its present name in 1960. NMSU offers over 180 degree programs, including 28 doctoral, 58 master's, and 96 baccalaureate programs. It had approximately 21,700 enrolled in Fall 2021, with a faculty-to-student ratio of roughly 1 to 16. New Mexico State's athletic teams, the Aggies, compete at the NCAA Division I level in the Western Athletic Conference except for football.

NMSU is classified as having "high research activity" among doctoral universities. It is particularly noted for its graduate programs in education, engineering, business, and nursing. NMSU is the chief space grant college in New Mexico and leads one of 52 national consortia dedicated to space research.

History

Hiram Hadley, an Earlham College-educated teacher from Indiana, founded Las Cruces College. Upon its opening on September 17, 1888, it included an elementary school, a university preparatory school, and a business school; Simon F. Kropp wrote in Arizona and the West that this institution "was not a college in the contemporary meaning of the word".

A year later, the Territorial Assembly of New Mexico provided for the establishment of an agricultural college and agricultural experiment station with Bill No. 28, the Rodey Act of 1889. It stated: "Said institution is hereby located at or near the town of Las Cruces in the County of Doña Ana, upon a tract of land of not less than one hundred (100) acres, This land could be contiguous to the main Las Cruces irrigating ditch, south of said town." Designated as the land-grant college for New Mexico under the Morrill Act, it was named the New Mexico College of Agriculture and Mechanic Arts.

Las Cruces College merged with the New Mexico College of Agriculture and Mechanical Arts and opened on January 21, 1890. It began with 35 students and six faculty members. The college was supposed to graduate its first student in 1893, but the only senior, named Sam Steel, was murdered before he was able to receive his diploma. Classes met in the two-room adobe building of Las Cruces College until new buildings were erected on the  campus three miles (5 km) south of Las Cruces. In February 1891, McFie Hall, popularly known as Old Main, opened its doors. McFie Hall burned down in 1910, but its remains can be seen in the center of Pride Field on the University Horseshoe.

In 1960, to better represent its expanded programs and operations, New Mexico A&M was renamed New Mexico State University by a state constitutional amendment.

New Mexico State University now has a  campus and enrolls more than 21,000 students from the United States and 71 foreign countries. Full-time faculty members number 694, with a staff of 3,113.

Organization and administration
Regulated by the New Mexico Constitution, the Regents of New Mexico State University are a corporate body that implements legislation over the control and management of NMSU. The board is made of up five persons appointed by the governor of New Mexico with the consent of the senate. Four members are qualified electors of the state of New Mexico, and one is a member of the student body. Non-student members serve six years and student members serve two years.

The NMSU faculty senate consists of 60 elected faculty and has legal authority over all academic policies across the NMSU system.

Campus
It is located adjacent to Interstate 25, surrounded by desert landscape and greenhouses. The main campus is also bordered by Interstate 10, which is the main east–west interstate highway across the southern part of the United States. To the east of Interstate 25, the campus facilities consist of the President's residence, NMSU Golf Course, the "A" Mountain west slope, and the New Mexico Farm and Ranch Heritage Museum. South of University Avenue are Pan American Plaza, 48 acres of horse farm, and the Fabian Garcia Science center, which houses the Chile Pepper Institute's research, teaching and demonstration garden, algal biofuels research equipment, grape vineyards and gazebos, and fields and greenhouses for plant research projects. About six miles south of campus, on 203 acres of land, is the Leyendecker Plant Science Research Center.

The Las Cruces campus is home to a nesting population of Swainson's hawks, a raptor species currently protected by federal law. In defense of their nest, the hawks are often mistaken for attacking pedestrians. Pedestrians are advised to be careful when walking on Stewart Street, as signs have been posted all across. Umbrellas are also being provided to students for their convenience, as well as protection from the aggressive nesting hawks.

The first master plan of the university was to create a "Horseshoe", a U-shaped drive, in an open large lawn. At the center was Old Main, the original campus building, originally known as McFie Hall, which was destroyed by fire in 1910 (the remains are now a college landmark). The cornerstone and remains of Mcfie Hall stand near the flagpole in the middle of the Horseshoe. Today, the Horseshoe is the center of campus and is the location of the main administration building, Hadley Hall, which sits at the top of the Horseshoe, and other classroom buildings.

NMSU is a land-grant institution with a presence in all 33 counties of New Mexico, a satellite learning center in Albuquerque, 13 research and science centers, distance education opportunities, and five campuses in Alamogordo, Carlsbad, Grants, Doña Ana County, and Las Cruces.

Medical school 

The Burrell College of Osteopathic Medicine at New Mexico State University (BCOM), a private medical school, is located on NMSU's main campus. Medical students can utilize the facilities and amenities of NMSU's campus, including on-campus student housing. BCOM began instruction in August 2016 and will graduate its first class in May 2020. BCOM and NMSU created a pipeline program whereby NMSU students who meet certain qualifications during their undergraduate studies are guaranteed a seat at the medical school following graduating from NMSU. In addition, BCOM has established a scholarship fund at NMSU. BCOM is the first osteopathic medical school in New Mexico and just one of two medical schools in the state, the other being in Albuquerque at the University of New Mexico.

Housing
NMSU Housing is available to students who choose to live on campus. There are several residential areas to choose from, including residential halls, apartments, graduate housing, family communities, living learning communities, and theme communities. Housing includes:

Chamisa Village Apartments Stage I
Chamisa Village Apartments Stage II
Cervantes Village Apartment Complex
Juniper Hall
Garcia Hall
Pinon Hall
Rhodes Garrett Hamiel
Tom Fort and Sutherland Village
Vista Del Monte Apartments

Libraries

NMSU has two major libraries on the main campus, Branson Hall Library and Zuhl Library. Both libraries have a total collection of more than 1 million volumes.

Branson Hall Library
Branson Hall Library was built in 1951 and houses texts and resources related to engineering, business, agriculture, science, special collections, maps, government publications, and archives. A sculpture made of bronze named "Joy of Learning", created by Grant Kinzer, former Department Head of Entomology, Plant Pathology and Weed Science, can be found on the north side of Branson Hall.

Zuhl Library
Zuhl Library was built in 1992 at a cost of $3 million. The library houses texts and resources related to the arts, humanities, and sciences. North of Zuhl Library is a 20-foot-wide steel and granite sculpture, named "A Quest for Knowledge", which was created by Federico Armijo, an Albuquerque native.

Museums and collections
NMSU is home to several museums, collections, and galleries. The NMSU Arthropod Museum, which houses more than 150,000 research and 5,000 teaching specimens, is housed in Skeen Hall. Specimens are used globally for taxonomic research and within the state for community outreach. The University Museum (established in 1959) serves the community as a repository and exhibitor of local and regional culture and history. The Klipsch Museum is a tribute to Paul and Valerie Klipsch, who provided materials representing more than 80 years of audio engineering. It is located in NMSU's Foreman Engineering Complex.  The Zuhl Collection combines the functions of an art gallery and natural history museum and showcases thousands of specimens of petrified wood, fossils, and minerals.

Police department 
The university has a dedicated police department employing 35 people, including 22 full-time commissioned police officers. The number of employed personnel expands greatly during special events such as concerts or sporting events, with as many as 50 security guards and dozens of additional officers from other departments. In addition to the Las Cruces campus, the department also has authority for all university-owned campuses, lands, and facilities around the state.

The department also offers personal defense courses for females on campus, including training in rape prevention, escape and the proper use of pepper sprays. Campus officers receive training on gender identity/expression issues, which has helped the university achieve an overall score of 4 out of 5 for LGBT friendliness.

Academics
NMSU offers a wide variety of programs across multiple disciplines, including agriculture, education, engineering, and the sciences. There are 58 master's degree programs, 96 baccalaureate degree programs 28 doctoral programs. Over 4,400 courses are available across 54 academic departments. 

In addition to the main campus in Las Cruces, NMSU has community colleges in Alamogordo, Doña Ana County, and Grants, through which it offers academic, vocational/technical, and continuing education programs. In accord with its land-grant mission, the university provides informal, off-campus educational programs through the Cooperative Extension Service. Through a statewide network of nine research facilities, the Agricultural Experiment Station conducts basic and applied research supporting agriculture, natural resources management, environmental quality, and improved quality of life.

NMSU is divided into six colleges and a graduate school:
College of Agricultural, Consumer and Environmental Sciences
College of Arts and Sciences
College of Business
College of Engineering
College of Health, Education and Social Transformation
Honors College
Graduate School

Rankings
According to the 2022 college rankings by U.S. News & World Report, NMSU is tied for 263 among National Universities and tied for 132 among public universities in the U.S. USN&WR ranked several programs among the top 200 in the nation, including the College of Engineering's graduate program at 149, the Nursing School for master's degrees (139; tied) and Doctoral degrees (109), and the College of Education's graduate program (125; tied). Forbes listed NMSU as one of "America's Top Colleges in 2021", based on indicators such as alumni salary, debt, return on investment, and graduation rate.

In 2015, Business Insider ranked NMSU 42 among the "50 most underrated colleges in America", based on a comparison USN&WR’s rankings of Best Colleges with PayScale’s 2015-16 College Salary Report, which ranked more than 1,000 institutions based on mid-career salaries of graduates. The same year, New Mexico State was listed among the top 12 percent of schools that help improve students’ economic status, according CollegeNET’s "Social Mobility Index", based on factors such as tuition, economic background, graduation rate, early career salary, and endowment. In 2022, NMSU was among the top 35 percent of schools in the SMI rankings.

NMSU is recognized as a top institution for minority students. In 2021, it was recognized as one of the Top 100 Colleges and Universities for Hispanics by Hispanic Outlook on Education Magazine. A 2017 report by the National Science Foundation’s National Center for Science and Engineering Statistics ranked NMSU first for federal funding for science and engineering activities for minority-serving institutions. In 2016, NMSU was among the top 10 universities in awarding bachelor’s degrees to Hispanics, including for communications technologies/technicians and support services (seventh); agriculture, agriculture operations and related sciences (eighth); hospitality administration/management (ninth); engineering technologies and engineering-related fields (10); and education (10). The school also ranked among the top 10 universities in conferring bachelor’s degrees to Native Americans, including for marketing (fourth); engineering (fourth); agriculture, agriculture operations and related sciences (fourth); physical sciences (fifth); engineering technologies and engineering-related fields (fifth); and computer and information sciences and support services (ninth). The school also ranked ninth for awarding bachelor’s degrees to minorities overall for agriculture, agriculture operations and related sciences.

Institutes and research programs

Research programs

The university is home to New Mexico's NASA Space Grant Program.

In 2010, the NMSU Physical Sciences Laboratory secured a study contract with Reaction Engines Limited, a British aerospace company that is developing technology for an airbreathing single stage to orbit, precooled air turboramjet based spaceplane.

The NMSU Department of Astronomy operates the Sunspot Solar Observatory and Apache Point Observatory, in Sunspot, New Mexico, including the site of the Sloan Digital Sky Survey.

NMSU is a research active university, with $150 million per year in externally funded research programs. Its estimated annual economic impact in New Mexico is $1 billion. Anchoring the southern end of New Mexico's Rio Grande Research Corridor, NMSU is the only university to reach the platinum, or highest, level of service to NASA's Space Alliance Technology Outreach Program. SATOP makes the expertise of corporate and university researchers available to small businesses.

Academic centers and research institutes
 Agricultural Experiment Station – conducts basic and applied research supporting agriculture, natural resources management, environmental quality, and improved quality of life.
 Arrowhead Center – provides business assistance, technology incubation, intellectual property commercialization, economic policy analysis to local businesses as well as students, staff and faculty at the university.
 Institute for Energy and Environment (IEE) – a multidisciplinary, energy sector and water resource institute. IEE's goal is to provide global leadership, expertise, and technology for public policy, technical and human resource development to meet growing energy and water needs. The International Environmental Design Contest is co-hosted by the IEE.
 Manufacturing Technology and Engineering Center (M-TEC) – supports economic development in New Mexico by providing manufacturing education, technical assistance, and other extension services to industries in New Mexico.

Student life

Student organizations
NMSU student organizations include a Greek system and several religious organizations. The Associated Students of New Mexico State University (ASNMSU) is the student government and is considered a departmental organization. It consists of an elected student body president, vice president, 30 senators, and an appointed student supreme court. Senators are elected to two semester terms, with two elections each school year, in each, 15 senators are elected. There are 12 different departments within ASNMSU, who manage various events such as the homecoming parade, free student concerts, a free cab program for students, and many others. Each department is overseen by a director, who is appointed by the president and confirmed by the senate. ASNMSU manages a budget of over $1 million.

Greek life
Fraternities and sororities at New Mexico State University include:

 Golden Key International Honour Society
 The National Society of Collegiate Scholars
 Sigma Alpha Pi The National Society of Leadership and Success
 Gamma Beta Phi
 Phi Sigma Pi

Media
Founded in 1907, The Round Up is the oldest student-run news publication at New Mexico State University. In fall 2017, it reduced its printing frequency and now provides current online news coverage as well as special print editions.

KRWG-TV is a full-service television station in Las Cruces, New Mexico, and is operated and owned by New Mexico State University. It is a member station of PBS (Public Broadcasting Service).

Puerto del Sol is a literary magazine run by graduate students in the English Department. It has been in print for over fifty years and currently publishes biannually. The magazine also curates a Black Voices series on its website.

News22 is a student-run television newscast that airs live on KRWG-TV three days per week during the nine-month academic year. The broadcast is produced by New Mexico State University journalism students. In 2011, News22 added Noticias22 en Español, a Spanish language broadcast that airs Tuesdays and Wednesdays in Las Cruces, Silver City and El Paso, Texas.

Kokopelli is an online news publication produced by New Mexico State University journalism students. Kokopelli provides breaking news, features and weekly sports coverage during the nine-month academic year. Kokopelli is a member of the Associated Collegiate Press.

NMSU also owns and operates two radio stations: KRUX (91.5 FM) and KRWG-FM.

KRUX is an entirely student–run, non-commercial radio station located in Las Cruces, New Mexico, that was founded in 1989. KRUX is financed through student fees administered by the Associated Students of New Mexico State University, the student government of NMSU. KRUX is a member of the Collegiate Music Journal Network.

KRWG-FM (90.7 FM) is a public, non-commercial, full-service FM radio station. It serves the area within southwestern New Mexico and Far West Texas. It is an affiliated station of National Public Radio and features NPR programming.

Traditions

Aggies
The nickname was derived from its roots and beginnings as an agricultural school and the state's only designated land-grant university.

Victory Bell

In the 1940s, the Victory Bell, a gift of the Class of 1939, was housed in an open-sided structure on the Horseshoe and rung to announce Aggie victories. In 1972, the bell was rededicated as the NMSU Engineer's Bell and mounted on a platform near Goddard Hall. On game days, various school organizations took turns in toting the ringing bell around Las Cruces before kick-off. The Bell was then taken to Aggie Memorial Stadium where it rang after Aggie touchdowns. More recently, the bell has been permanently mounted at field level just behind the south goal post of the stadium.

"A" Tradition
In 1920, students of then New Mexico College of Agriculture and Mechanic Arts scouted for an appropriate place to display their school letter. Tortugas Mountain, located three miles (5 km) east of campus, seemed a natural spot. Brave males gathered enough stones to form a big "A" easily visible from campus and the surrounding area. On the following day, April 1, students trudged up the mountain side with their five-gallon cans of whitewash and splashed it on the stones, turning them into a gleaming white "A". For many years, giving the "A" its annual fresh coat of whitewash was an all-school effort. The seniors mixed lime and water at the foot of the mountain and the freshmen and sophomores toted the mixture up to the juniors who splashed it on the "A." With the growth of the university through the years, the tradition was taken over by the Greek Council.

The Pride of New Mexico Marching Band
The marching band of New Mexico State University is known as the Pride of New Mexico. It is composed of approximately 200 musicians, dancers, and auxiliary. They provide entertainment at football games, parades, and other NMSU events. Timothy Lautzenheiser was director of the band, naming it the Pride of New Mexico, from 1976 to 1979. The Pride Marching Band was the first collegiate marching band to be invited to the London New Year's Day Parade in 1987 and has performed at dozens of NFL halftimes, including most recently a Denver Broncos-San Francisco 49ers game in 2014 and a San Diego Chargers-Jacksonville Jaguars game in 2016.

The Wonder Dog
At kickoff of every NMSU home football game, Aggie fans await the "Wonder Dog" to retrieve the kicking tee from the football field. This tradition started in the mid 1990s. The first "Wonder Dog" was Smoki, a border collie-Australian shepherd mix born in Capitan, New Mexico, and trained by Joel Sims, an NMSU alumni. Smoki "The Wonder Dog" entertained the Aggie crowd for six years and retired in 2002. She also debuted in a Hollywood film which co-starred Kevin Costner and Dennis Quaid, entitled "Wyatt Earp", as a town dog. Smoki "The Wonder Dog" died at the age of 15 in 2005. Since then, the tradition ended until 2012, when a tryout for the next "Wonder Dog" took place. A panel of celebrity judges chose a four-year old border collie, Striking as the next "Wonder Dog". Striking first appeared on August 30, 2012, at the NMSU-Sacramento State home game.

Crimson Fridays
Every Friday, some students, faculties, staff, and alumni of NMSU wear crimson colors to show support for the university and the school's sports programs.

NMSU ring
The official ring of New Mexico State University is given to students with junior and senior standing, and alumni of NMSU, to celebrate and commemorate their achievements and NMSU traditions. The official Ring Ceremony is sponsored by the Alumni Association, which is held every spring and fall Semester at the Aggie Memorial Tower.

The official ring is manufactured by Balfour, which comes with white gold and yellow gold, with an optional stone; diamond or cubic zirconia at the centerpiece of the ring; and is presented with Hatch Chile Ristra. The top of the ring highlights the NMSU three triangles school seal, encircled with the school name. The three triangles represent NMSU's role as a land-grant university – teaching, research, and service. It also represents the connection of Spanish, American Indian, and Anglo cultures in New Mexico, and the triangulation of NMSU campus with Interstate 10 linking Interstate 25 in the first principal interchange of the Pan American Highway in North America. The one side of the ring shows the Aggie Memorial Tower, in honor of Aggies who died for the country, and the other side of the ring displays the majestic Organ Mountains. Students wear the ring facing the school name.  Upon granting of degrees, graduates should turn the ring around facing outward, which symbolizes that they are ready to face the world.

Noche de Luminarias
A tradition that signals the beginning of the holiday season is the "Noche de Luminarias" or "Night of Lights". A university tradition that started as the President's Holiday Reception in 1984, which starts the holiday season with a night of entertainment and festivities. It is considered one of the largest luminaria displays in the state of New Mexico.

Each candle set is lit inside a paper bag. With more than 6,000 luminarias, it begins at the Educational Services Building, extends towards the International Mall and then encircles the Corbett Center Student Union. The display is set up by the Las Cruces High School band and serenades visitors as they walk through the lighted path by the Las Cruces High School Brass Choir.

Athletics

NMSU's teams are called the Aggies, a nickname derived from the university's agricultural beginnings. New Mexico State is a member of the Western Athletic Conference (WAC), except in football where NMSU competes as an independent. The Western Athletic Conference was the fifth conference NMSU has been affiliated with in its football history. New Mexico State spent the past six seasons as a member of the Sun Belt Conference. Before that, NMSU was a member of the Big West Conference (called the Pacific Coast Athletic Association until 1988), Sun Belt Conference, Missouri Valley Conference and the Border Conference. Another athletic program at New Mexico State was the women's Equestrian Team. The Equestrian Team was first established in 2004. The Equestrian team was cut following the 2016–2017 season due to budget cuts.

Rivalries

NMSU maintains strong athletic rivalries with the University of New Mexico. The UNM-NMSU rivalry is called the Rio Grande Rivalry (aka Battle of I-25), a competitive series based on points awarded to the winners of head-to-head competitions between the two universities in every sport. A rotating trophy is granted to the winning university for a period of one year, until the award presentation the following year. Different traditions take place at each school the night before game day.

The university also has a strong rivalry with the University of Texas at El Paso known as The Battle of I-10. UTEP and NMSU are located just over 40 miles apart.

Notable people

Alumni
There are approximately 120,000 living NMSU alumni. The NMSU Alumni Association is one of the university's oldest organizations, dating from May 24, 1898.  Notable alumnae include Kevin Johnson, President and CEO of Starbucks Corporation; Paul Wilbur Klipsch, founder of Klipsch Audio Technologies; Jerome Shaw, EVP/COO of Volt Information Sciences, Inc; Christine Aguilera, president of SkyMall; Jorge Gardea-Torresdey, a nanoparticle researcher and professor at the University of Texas at El Paso; Alvy Ray Smith, co-founder of Pixar; and Kathy Lueders, the first woman to head NASA's human spaceflight program as the Associate Administrator of the Human Exploration and Operations (HEO) Mission Directorate.

Faculty
Notable faculty include:
 Paul Bosland, an internationally recognized authority on chile who leads the university's chile breeding research program and directs the Chile Pepper Institute at NMSU
 Clyde Tombaugh, an astronomer best known for his discovery of Pluto
 Antonya Nelson, named by The New Yorker as one of the 20 best young fiction writers in America, who has published three novels and more than 50 stories
 Lisa Grayshield, healer, enrolled member of the Washoe Tribe of Nevada and California, and advocate of Indigenous Ways of Knowing (IWOK)

Notes

References

External links

New Mexico State Athletics website

 
1888 establishments in New Mexico Territory
Buildings and structures in Doña Ana County, New Mexico
Education in Cibola County, New Mexico
Education in Doña Ana County, New Mexico
Education in Eddy County, New Mexico
Education in Otero County, New Mexico
Educational institutions established in 1888
Land-grant universities and colleges
Public universities and colleges in New Mexico
Buildings and structures in Las Cruces, New Mexico
New Mexico State